Franca Pilla (or Franca Ciampi; born 19 December 1920) was the first lady of Italy, when Carlo Azeglio Ciampi was president of Italy from 1999 to 2006.

Life
Pilla was born in Reggio Emilia on 19 December 1920.

Pilla was in education when she was eighteen and there she met her future husband who was of the same age. They met at a "dancing tea" which was a respectable way to meet. The tea was organised by mothers, and boys and girls would be allowed to practise dancing with each other. 

After the war when her boyfriend had been a soldier and then a resistance fighter, they had a year's engagement and then they married in Bologna when she was 25. They spent over seventy years together. During that time her husband was prime minister, he led Italy's central bank and he was Minister of Finance. In 1999 he became Italy's President until 2006 when he became a senator for life. 

Pilla was sometimes less than diplomatic. During a tour of Naples, in the south of Italy, she was quoted as saying that the Italians in the south were better and more intelligent. She was known for her openness, giving the pope advice when they met. She encouraged people to read and to ignore the TV.

Pilla celebrated her 100th birthday in December 2020. Pilla and Ciampi were married until his death on 16 September 2016.

References

External links

1920 births
Living people
20th-century Italian educators
20th-century Italian women
21st-century Italian women
Italian centenarians
People from Reggio Emilia
Women centenarians
Spouses of Italian presidents
Spouses of prime ministers of Italy